Ol' School is a live album by Ohio Players. It was recorded on 2 December 1995 at the Fox Theater, Atlanta, Georgia.

Track listing	
 "Skin Tight" –  6:16
 "Ol' School" –  3:53
 "Pain" – 	1:39
 "Heaven Must Be Like This" – 	4:29
 "Sweet Sticky Thing" –  6:03
 "Thank You" –  1:05
 "I Wanna Be Free" – 	5:59
 "Love Rollercoaster" –  6:41
 "Fire" –  11:11
 "Megamix" –  4:07

Personnel	
	
Eric Alexander  – trombone
Mike Barry  – trumpet
Leroy "Sugarfoot" Bonner  – guitar, vocals, producer
Darwin Dortch  – bass guitar, vocals
Laurence Etkin  – trumpet
Bob Funk  – trombone
Arno Hect  – tenor saxophone
Robert Lorenzo Jones  – percussion
Robert "Rumba" Jones  – percussion
Odeen Mays  – keyboards, vocals
Ron Nooks  – keyboards, vocals
Sam Skelton  – saxophone
James "Diamond" Williams  – percussion, drums, vocals, producer
Clarence Willis  – rhythm guitar, vocals
James Willis  – percussion, drums, vocals
Stutz Wimmer  – saxophone

Production	
	
Dennis Clark  – Clothing/Wardrobe
Rikki Garmon  – Make-Up
Marti Griffin  – Photography
Marty Griffin  – Photography
Jimmy Z.  – Engineer
Don Johnson  – Executive Producer, Cover Design
Jill McCarthy  – Graphic Design
Rodney Mills  – Engineer, Mastering
Joe Neil  – Engineer
Dany Nieves  – Photography
Rob Patterson  – Executive Producer
Allan Queen  – Programming, Producer
Angela Rogers  – Artwork, Art Direction, Cover Art Concept, Cover Design
Shawn Salter  – Producer, Graphic Design
Trammell Starks  – Producer
Claire Stigall  – Text
Philip White  – Producer
Kenneth Williams  – Crew

References

External links
 Ol' School at Discogs

Ohio Players albums
1996 live albums